The 2023 FC Cincinnati season will be the club's fifth season in MLS, and the eighth season of a team playing under the FC Cincinnati brand after three years in the lower-division USL Championship. The club enters 2023 on a high note, having notched their first playoff appearance and first playoff win in 2022 after languishing at the bottom of the standings for their first three seasons in MLS. FC Cincinnati home matches will be played at TQL Stadium. 2023 will be the second season with the club for general manager Chris Albright and head coach Pat Noonan.

Club

Roster

Player movement

In

Out

Loans in

Loans out

2023 MLS SuperDraft picks

Competitions

Preseason 
On January 9, FC Cincinnati announced a slate of five preseason games to be played during their 26-day preseason camp in Clearwater, Florida.

Major League Soccer

League tables

Eastern Conference

Overall

Results

U.S. Open Cup 

FC Cincinnati will enter the U.S. Open Cup in the Third Round. The schedule has not yet been announced.

Leagues Cup

Central 3

Statistics

Appearances and goals 
Numbers after plus-sign(+) denote appearances as a substitute.

|-
! colspan=16 style=background:#dcdcdc; text-align:center|Goalkeepers
|-

|-
! colspan=16 style=background:#dcdcdc; text-align:center|Defenders
|-

|-
! colspan=16 style=background:#dcdcdc; text-align:center|Midfielders
|-

|-
! colspan=16 style=background:#dcdcdc; text-align:center|Forwards
|-

|-

Top scorers 
{| class="wikitable" style="font-size: 100%; text-align: center;"
|-
! style="background:#003087; color:#FFFFFF; border:2px solid #FE5000; width:35px;" scope="col"|Rank
! style="background:#003087; color:#FFFFFF; border:2px solid #FE5000; width:35px;" scope="col"|Position
! style="background:#003087; color:#FFFFFF; border:2px solid #FE5000; width:35px;" scope="col"|No.
! style="background:#003087; color:#FFFFFF; border:2px solid #FE5000; width:140px;" scope="col"|Name
! style="background:#003087; color:#FFFFFF; border:2px solid #FE5000; width:75px;" scope="col"|
! style="background:#003087; color:#FFFFFF; border:2px solid #FE5000; width:75px;" scope="col"|
! style="background:#003087; color:#FFFFFF; border:2px solid #FE5000; width:75px;" scope="col"|
! style="background:#003087; color:#FFFFFF; border:2px solid #FE5000; width:75px;" scope="col"|Total
|-
|rowspan="2"|1 || MF  || 93 || align=left| Júnior Moreno || 2 || 0 || 0 || 2
|-
|| FW || 17 || align=left| Sérgio Santos || 2 || 0 || 0 || 2
|-
|rowspan="2"|2 || MF  || 5 || align=left| Obinna Nwobodo || 1 || 0 || 0 || 1
|-
|| FW || 9 || align=left| Brenner || 1 || 0 || 0 || 1
|-
!colspan="4"|Total
!6!!0!!0!!6

Top assists 
{| class="wikitable" style="font-size: 100%; text-align: center;"
|-
! style="background:#003087; color:#FFFFFF; border:2px solid #FE5000; width:35px;" scope="col"|Rank
! style="background:#003087; color:#FFFFFF; border:2px solid #FE5000; width:35px;" scope="col"|Position
! style="background:#003087; color:#FFFFFF; border:2px solid #FE5000; width:35px;" scope="col"|No.
! style="background:#003087; color:#FFFFFF; border:2px solid #FE5000; width:160px;" scope="col"|Name
! style="background:#003087; color:#FFFFFF; border:2px solid #FE5000; width:75px;" scope="col"|
! style="background:#003087; color:#FFFFFF; border:2px solid #FE5000; width:75px;" scope="col"|
! style="background:#003087; color:#FFFFFF; border:2px solid #FE5000; width:75px;" scope="col"|
! style="background:#003087; color:#FFFFFF; border:2px solid #FE5000; width:75px;" scope="col"|Total
|-
| 1 || MF || 10 || align=left| Luciano Acosta || 2 || 0 || 0 || 2
|-
| rowspan="6"|2 || MF || 10 || align=left| Marco Angulo || 1 || 0 || 0 || 1
|-
| MF || 31 || align=left| Álvaro Barreal || 1 || 0 || 0 || 1
|-
| MF || 93 || align=left| Júnior Moreno || 1 || 0 || 0 || 1
|-
| MF || 5 || align=left| Obinna Nwobodo || 1 || 0 || 0 || 1
|-
| FW || 9 || align=left| Brenner || 1 || 0 || 0 || 1
|-
| FW || 19 || align=left| Brandon Vazquez || 1 || 0 || 0 || 1
|-
!colspan="4"|Total
!8!!0!!0!!8

Disciplinary record 
{| class="wikitable" style="font-size: 100%; text-align:center;"
|-
| rowspan="2" !width=15|
| rowspan="2" !width=15|
| rowspan="2" !width=120|Player
| colspan="3"|MLS
| colspan="3"|MLS Cup
| colspan="3"|USOC
| colspan="3"|Total
|-
!width=34; background:#fe9;|
!width=34; background:#fe9;|
!width=34; background:#ff8888;|
!width=34; background:#fe9;|
!width=34; background:#fe9;|
!width=34; background:#ff8888;|
!width=34; background:#fe9;|
!width=34; background:#fe9;|
!width=34; background:#ff8888;|
!width=34; background:#fe9;|
!width=34; background:#fe9;|
!width=34; background:#ff8888;|
|-
|| 31 || MF ||align=left| Álvaro Barreal || 2 || 0 || 0 || 0 || 0 || 0 || 0 || 0 || 0 || 2 || 0 || 0
|-
|| 10 || MF ||align=left| Luciano Acosta || 1 || 0 || 0 || 0 || 0 || 0 || 0 || 0 || 0 || 1 || 0 || 0
|-
|| 17 || FW|| align=left| Sérgio Santos || 1 || 0 || 0 || 0 || 0 || 0 || 0 || 0 || 0 || 1 || 0 || 0
|-
|| 19 || FW|| align=left| Brandon Vazquez || 1 || 0 || 0 || 0 || 0 || 0 || 0 || 0 || 0 || 1 || 0 || 0
|-
|| 4 || DF ||align=left| Nick Hagglund || 0 || 0 || 1 || 0 || 0 || 0 || 0 || 0 || 0 || 0 || 0 || 1
|-
!colspan=3|Total !!4!!0!!1!!0!!0!!0!!0!!0!!0!!4!!0!!1

Clean sheets
{| class="wikitable sortable" style="text-align: center;"
|-
! style="background:#003087; color:#FFFFFF; border:2px solid #FE5000; width:35px;" scope="col"|No.
! style="background:#003087; color:#FFFFFF; border:2px solid #FE5000; width:130px;" scope="col"|Name
! style="background:#003087; color:#FFFFFF; border:2px solid #FE5000; width:50px;" scope="col"|
! style="background:#003087; color:#FFFFFF; border:2px solid #FE5000; width:50px;" scope="col"|
! style="background:#003087; color:#FFFFFF; border:2px solid #FE5000; width:50px;" scope="col"|
! style="background:#003087; color:#FFFFFF; border:2px solid #FE5000; width:50px;" scope="col"|Total
! style="background:#003087; color:#FFFFFF; border:2px solid #FE5000; width:50px;" scope="col"|Games
|-
|18|| align=left| Roman Celentano || 2 || 0 || 0 || 2 || 3
|-

Awards

MLS Team of the Matchday 
{| class=wikitable
|-
! style="background:#003087; color:#FFFFFF; border:2px solid #FE5000;" scope="col"|Matchday
! style="background:#003087; color:#FFFFFF; border:2px solid #FE5000;" scope="col"|Player
! style="background:#003087; color:#FFFFFF; border:2px solid #FE5000;" scope="col"|Opponent
! style="background:#003087; color:#FFFFFF; border:2px solid #FE5000;" scope="col"|Position
! style="background:#003087; color:#FFFFFF; border:2px solid #FE5000;" scope="col"|Ref
|-
| align=center rowspan="1"|1
|  Obinna Nwobodo 
| rowspan="1"|Houston Dynamo FC
| MF
| rowspan="1"|
|-
| align=center rowspan="2"|3
|  Obinna Nwobodo 
| rowspan="2"|Seattle Sounders FC
| MF
| rowspan="2"|
|-
|  Brenner
| Bench
|-
| align=center rowspan="1"|4
|  Júnior Moreno 
| rowspan="1"|Chicago Fire FC
| MF
| rowspan="1"|
|-}

MLS Player of the Week

MLS Player of the Month

MLS All-Star

References 

2023 Major League Soccer season
Cincinnati
FC Cincinnati
2023